Rolf Erlend Vestre (born 1964) is a Norwegian orienteering competitor and World champion. He won a gold medal in the 1989 World Orienteering Championships in Skaraborg with the Norwegian Relay team. He received a silver medal in the 1991 World Orienteering Championships in Marianske Lazne.

He represented IL Tyrving.

References

1964 births
Living people
Sportspeople from Bærum
Norwegian orienteers
Male orienteers
Foot orienteers
World Orienteering Championships medalists
20th-century Norwegian people
21st-century Norwegian people